Eucalyptus tholiformis is a species of tree that is endemic to a small area in Queensland. It has rough, deeply furrowed iron bark on the trunk and larger branches, lance-shaped adult leaves, flower buds in groups of seven, white flowers and cup-shaped to funnel-shaped fruit.

Description
It has thick, furrowed dark grey to black bark on the trunk and larger branches, sometimes smooth white bark on the thinner branches. Flowering occurs between May and October and the flowers are white.

Taxonomy and naming
Eucalyptus tholiformis was first formally described in 1994 by Anthony Bean and Ian Brooker in the journal Austrobaileya from specimens collected by Bean in the Salvator Rosa section of Carnarvon National Park in 1986. The specific epithet (tholiformis) is a Latin word meaning "dome-shaped", referring to the shape of the disc around the fruit.

Distribution and habitat
This tree grows on shallow soil on sandstone hills in Carnarvon National Park from west of Alpha to east of Tambo in Queensland.

Conservation status
This eucalypt is classified as "least concern" under the Queensland Government Nature Conservation Act 1992.

See also
List of Eucalyptus species

References

Trees of Australia
tholiformis
Myrtales of Australia
Flora of Queensland